The Oval is a multi-use stadium in Caernarfon, Wales.  It is currently used mostly for football matches and is the home ground of Caernarfon Town F.C.  The stadium holds 3,000 people, with 600 seats.

The previous seating for the Hendre End of the ground was purchased from Shrewsbury Town when they became surplus to requirements due to the demolition of Gay Meadow. They have since been removed and replaced with yellow and green seats funded by the Football Trust.

References

Football venues in Wales
Stadiums in Wales
Oval
Caernarfon Town F.C.